Cerstin Schmidt (born 5 March 1963 in Zwickau, Bezirk Karl-Marx-Stadt) is an East German luger who competed during the mid to late 1980s. She won the bronze medal in the women's singles event at the 1988 Winter Olympics in Calgary.

Schmidt also won three medals at the FIL World Luge Championships with one gold (1987) and two silvers (1981, 1985) as well as four medals at the FIL European Luge Championships with one gold (Women's singles: 1986), one silver (Mixed team: 1988) and two bronzes (Women's singles: 1984, 1988).

Schmidt won the overall Luge World Cup title in the women's singles twice (1984/5, 1986/7).

References

 

Kluge, Volker. (2000). Das große Lexikon der DDR-Sportler. Berlin: Schwarzkopf & Schwarzkopf. 
 

 

1963 births
Living people
People from Zwickau
People from Bezirk Karl-Marx-Stadt
German female lugers
Sportspeople from Saxony
Olympic lugers of East Germany
Lugers at the 1988 Winter Olympics
Olympic bronze medalists for East Germany
Olympic medalists in luge
Medalists at the 1988 Winter Olympics
Recipients of the Patriotic Order of Merit in silver
20th-century German women